John Francis Quilty (January 21, 1921 – September 12, 1969) was a Canadian professional ice hockey centre. He played 125 games in the National Hockey League (NHL) playing for the Montreal Canadiens and Boston Bruins. He was awarded the Calder Memorial Trophy in 1941, as the rookie of the year in the NHL. He was the son of Silver Quilty.

Biography
Quilty was born in Ottawa, Ontario. He played junior hockey with Glebe Collegiate and the Ottawa St. Pats of the Ottawa City Hockey League. He became a professional with the Montreal Canadiens in 1940-41. Quilty recorded 34 points in 48 games and was awarded the Calder Memorial Trophy. After two seasons with the Canadiens, he joined the Royal Canadian Air Force where he kept active in hockey playing on RCAF teams in Toronto and Vancouver. In 1946-47, Quilty returned with the Canadiens. He played three games with the Canadiens while also playing in the American Hockey League with the Springfield Indians and the Buffalo Bisons. Quilty played part of the 1947-48 season with the Canadiens before being traded to the Boston Bruins. He suffered a compound fracture of his leg after six games with Boston and did not return to the NHL again.

Quilty played senior hockey for one season afterward for the North Sydney Victorias. In 1949-50, he joined the Ottawa RCAF Flyers for two seasons before joining the Ottawa Senators in the Quebec Senior Hockey League. Quilty would remain with the Senators until 1951-52 when he signed on with the Renfrew Millionaires of the East Coast Senior Hockey League. He was named the MVP of the ECSHL that year before retiring.

Quilty grew up watching the original Ottawa Senators play at home, was the light-heavyweight boxing champion of the Ottawa Valley in 1939. He was the son of Silver Quilty, a past president of the Canadian Amateur Hockey Association, and Canadian Football Hall of Fame inductee.

Quilty died suddenly at his home in Ottawa on September 12, 1969, at age of 48. He was posthumously inducted into the Ottawa Sports Hall of Fame.

Awards and achievements
Calder Memorial Trophy winner in 1941.
Selected as ECSHL MVP in 1952.
Inducted into the Ottawa Sports Hall of Fame in 1991.

Career statistics

Transactions
 November 19, 1946 - Traded to the Springfield Indians by the Montreal Canadiens (Buffalo Bisons).
 March 3, 1947 - Traded to the Montreal Canadiens by the Springfield Indians for cash.
 December 16, 1947 - Traded to the Boston Bruins by the Montreal Canadiens with Jimmy Peters for Joe Carveth.

References

External links
 

1921 births
1969 deaths
Boston Bruins players
Buffalo Bisons (AHL) players
Calder Trophy winners
Canadian ice hockey centres
Canadian military personnel of World War II
Ice hockey people from Ottawa
Montreal Canadiens players
Ottawa Senators (QSHL) players
Springfield Indians players